Karl II von Liechtenstein-Kastelkorn (1623–1695) was a Catholic priest and prince-bishop. In 1655 he was ordained priest in the Prince-Archbishopric of Salzburg (a part of today's Austria). Between 1664 and 1695 he served as Prince-Bishop of Olomouc  in the Moravia (a part of today's Czech Republic).  A cultured man who employed in his Kapelle Heinrich Ignaz Franz Biber,  the virtuoso violinist and composer, he was also among other things a collector of music, and maintained close ties with the imperial court in Vienna throughout his career.

In the period of his episcopacy many people were executed for alleged witchcraft, including the dean Christoph Alois Lautner who was sentenced to death and burned alive by the inquisition court in which also the personal secretary of the archbishop Karl was the member.

Sources
 Biographical sketch in "The Hierarchy of the Catholic Church"

1623 births
1695 deaths